The Metropolis of Corinth, Sicyon, Zemenon, Tarsos and Polyphengos is a metropolitan see of the Church of Greece in Corinthia, Greece. Since the Middle Ages it has also existed as a Roman Catholic titular see. The current metropolitan (since 2006) is Dionysios Mantalos.

History

The foundation of the See of Corinth is attributed to the Apostle Paul, who is held to have preached in the city and addressed multiple epistles to the Corinthian Church, two of which became canon. His successor and first bishop was Saint Apollos of Ephesus. Pope Clement I also wrote an epistle to the community, in the first century. In the Roman and early Byzantine periods, Corinth was the capital and metropolitan see of the province of Achaea (southern Greece).

The city was largely destroyed in the earthquakes of 365 and 375, followed by Alaric's invasion in 396. It was rebuilt on a smaller scale thereafter, but with grandiose buildings. Corinth declined from the 6th century on, and the main settlement moved from the lower city to the Acrocorinth. Despite its becoming the capital of the themes of Hellas and Peloponnese, it was not until the 9th century that the city began to recover, reaching its apogee in the 11th and 12th centuries, when it was the site of a flourishing silk industry. This prosperity ended with the Norman sack of 1147.

Besides St. Apollos, Le Quien (II, 155) mentions forty-three bishops for the Roman/Byzantine era: among them, St. Sosthenes, the disciple of St. Paul, St. Dionysius; Paul, brother of St. Peter, Bishop of Argos in the tenth century; St. Athanasius, in the same century; George, or Gregory, a commentator of liturgical hymns. Until the 9th century, Corinth remained the metropolis of southern Greece, and particularly the Peloponnese. Indeed, the bishop of Corinth was the only bishop from the Peloponnese to attend the Council of Ephesus in 431, and the only bishop from Greece to attend the Third Council of Constantinople in 680. From the early 9th century, however, the primacy of Corinth over the Peloponnese was challenged by the See of Patras, and from the 10th century on Corinth was restricted to the eastern Peloponnese and certain of the Ionian Islands. Based on the various Notitiae Episcopatuum from the 10th–12th centuries, Corinth counted seven suffragan sees: Cephalonia, Zakynthos, Damala, Lacedaemon/Monemvasia, Argos, Helos and Zemena.

In 1203/4, the city fell to the ambitious lord of the Argolid, Leo Sgouros, who secured possession of Corinth by inviting its Metropolitan, Nicholas, to Acronauplia for dinner, and then had him thrown from its heights. Sgouros' ambitions to create a state of his own in southern Greece were checked by the onslaught of the victorious Crusaders, who captured Corinth in 1210. 

After the city's capture, the Crusaders established a Latin Archbishopric to replace the Greek Orthodox see. Le Quien (III, 883) mentions twenty Latin prelates from 1210 to 1700, but Eubel (I, 218; II, 152) mentions twenty-two archbishops for the period from 1212 to 1476. Although Corinth was the oldest and most prestigious see in southern Greece, during the period of Frankish rule it was eclipsed by the Latin Archbishopric of Patras. 

The city was recovered by the Byzantine Despotate of the Morea in 1395, and, after a short period (1397–1404) of rule by the Knights Hospitaller, returned to Byzantine hands, where it remained until it fell to the Ottoman Empire on 8 August 1458. After the Byzantine recovery of the city, the Catholic see became a titular see. Today, the Metropolis of Corinth belongs to the Church of Greece, under the Archbishop of Athens and All Greece.

List of bishops

References

Sources
 
 
 
 Konrad Eubel, Hierarchia Catholica Medii Aevi, vol. 1 , p. 210; vol. 2, p. 136; vol. 3 , p. 178; vol. 4, pp. 164-165; vol. 5, p. 173; vol. 6, p. 183
 
"Corinthe", in Dictionnaire d'Histoire et de Géographie ecclésiastiques, vol. XIII, Paris 1956, pp. 876-880

External links
Official website

Corinth
Corinth
Corinth
1st-century establishments in the Roman Empire
Dioceses established in the 1st century
Catholic titular sees in Asia